The 2003 Rushmoor Council election took place on 1 May 2003 to elect members of Rushmoor Borough Council in Hampshire, England. One third of the council was up for election and the Conservative Party stayed in overall control of the council.

After the election, the composition of the council was:
Conservative 25
Liberal Democrat 10
Labour 6
Independent 1

Campaign
One third of the seats were being elected with the third placed councillor in the 2002 election having their seat be contested. While a couple of former councillors were attempting to win seats back, George Paparesti for the Liberal Democrats in Manor Park and Stella Olivier for Labour in Grange, Labour's group leader Andy Straker stood down at the election and did not defend his seat in North Town. Apart from the 3 main political parties there were also 3 Green, 1 English Democrat and 2 independent candidates.

Rushmoor was one of 18 councils which trialed electronic voting in the 2003 local elections.

Election result
The results saw no seats change hands with the Conservatives keeping their majority on the council. The closest results came in St Mark's ward where Conservative Diane Bedford held on by 30 votes over the Liberal Democrats after a recount and in Manor Park where again the Conservatives finished 47 votes ahead of the Liberal Democrats. Labour held their 2 seats in Heron Wood and North Town with reduced majorities but did not make any gains. Overall turnout in the election was 31%.

Following the election John Marsh remained the leader of the council and Conservatives after defeating a challenge from within the Conservative group by 14 votes to 11. Meanwhile, Keith Dibble became the new leader of the Labour group on the council.

Ward results

References

2003
2003 English local elections
2000s in Hampshire